The visa policy of Nepal is relatively liberal, allowing citizens of almost all nations to obtain a tourist visa on arrival. In accordance with the law, citizens of all countries except India require a visa to enter Nepal.

In January 2014, Nepal introduced an online visa application system.

All tourists are allowed to stay in Nepal for a maximum of 150 days in one calendar year. Visitors must hold passports that are valid for at least 6 months from the date of arrival.

Visa policy map

Freedom of movement
Citizens of  do not need a visa to enter Nepal, and can reside permanently as Nepali citizens with no restrictions, because Article 7 the 1950 Indo-Nepal Treaty of Peace and Friendship allows free movement of people between the two nations on a reciprocal basis.

Indian citizens can use any acceptable documents mentioned below to enter Nepal:

Indian Passport
Voter ID card with photograph.Note only valid Voter ID card plastic card is acceptable the black and white lamimated cards not accepted.
Registration certificate issued by the Indian embassy to the Indian citizen residing in Nepal
Ad hoc/temporary identity card issued by the Indian embassy to the Indian citizen in the event of emergency

Visa on arrival

With the exception of nationals of states mentioned below and holders of refugee travel documents, any foreign national can obtain a tourist visa on arrival. Multiple entry visas can be issued for a duration of stay of 15, 30 or 90 days. Holders of temporary passports are not eligible unless they hold a temporary passport issued by a European Union member state.

Visa on arrival is available at:
Tribhuvan International Airport, Kathmandu
Birganj (India border)
Bheemdatta (India border)
Dhangadhi (India border)
Nepalgunj (India border)
Kakarbhitta (India border)
Kodari (China side: Zhangmu Port, which is currently available for cargo transaction only)
Siddharthanagar (India border)

Visa required in advance
Citizens of the following states are required to apply for a visa prior to arrival in Nepal:

Visa fee waiver
Nationals of all SAARC member countries except Afghanistan can obtain a visa on arrival free of charge for 30 days. Those countries consist of:

Non-ordinary passports
Holders of diplomatic or service passports of following countries do not require a visa.

Statistics
Most visitors arriving to Nepal for tourism purpose were from the following countries (excluding India):

See also

Visa requirements for Nepalese citizens

References

External links
Department of Immigration of Nepal

Foreign relations of Nepal
Nepal